Agung Manunggal Bantul Mosque is a mosque located in Jenderal Sudirman st. no.1, Bantul, Yogyakarta, Indonesia. The mosque contains unique Javanese architectural style resembling Agung Demak Mosque, with characteristics such as mustaka (roof) which resembles Joglo, four saka (pillars) which are carved teak woods, and the entrance in the shape of Gunungan (Javanese iconic Wayang shape). The mosque can be reached by using private vehicles or public transportation, namely the bus which connects Yogyakarta and Bantul. From Giwangan terminal, visitors take the bus which bounds to Bantul street then get off at the Klodran intersection. The mosque is located right in the western part of the Klodran intersection adjacent to Bantul Regency Red Cross as well as a field where functions as parking spaces during large ceremonies.

See also
 Islam in Indonesia
 List of mosques in Indonesia

References

External links 
 Informasi lengkap mengenai Masjid Agung Manunggal
 Informasi di bantulkab.go.id
 Peta lokasi Masjid di Wikimapia
 Galeri foto di Foursquare

Buildings and structures in the Special Region of Yogyakarta
Javanese architecture
Mosques in Indonesia